Defqon.1 Weekend Festival is an annual music festival held in the Netherlands. In the past, it was also held in Chile and Australia. Founded in 2003 by festival organizer Q-dance, the festival plays mostly hardstyle and related genres such as hardcore, early and classic.

Events
The festival was previously held in mid-June on Almeerderstrand in Almere. Since 2011, it is hosted on the event site next to Walibi Holland in Biddinghuizen. Since 2009, the event has also been hosted in Sydney in mid-September, at the Sydney International Regatta Centre. Until 2011 (2014 for the Australian edition) the festival ran for 12 hours, from 11:00 am to 11:00 pm, and ended with a firework display. Since 2012, the festival was extended to three days. Since 2015, the Australian edition was extended to two days. Each edition also has an anthem, an official song that is played in conjunction with the festival. The festival is also livestreamed with video from the largest stages and audio for all the other stages through YouTube, and the Q-Dance website for people all around the world to tune into.

At the Dutch event the audience has grown to 65,000 visitors per day. In 2013, the Sydney event attracted 18,000 attendees. The same event saw the death of a male, around 20 drug overdoses and more than 80 arrested on drug charges.

On 17 September 2018, the New South Wales Premier, Gladys Berejiklian, announced her intention that Defqon.1 would not take place again, due to two deaths that took place at the 2018 festival. At this event seven hundred people sought medical assistance. Shane Rattenbury, the Greens leader in the ACT, has invited Defqon.1 to take place in Canberra where pill testing could be carried out after a successful trial with Groovin the Moo.

On 29 May 2019, Q-dance announced on its official Facebook profiles that Defqon.1 Australia, after a decade being held at the Sydney International Regatta Centre (Penrith), would be indefinitely suspended, since they were "unable to secure a suitable replacement venue for the event to take place [...]"

2020 did not see Defqon.1 held after the Dutch prime minister Mark Rutte declared that all events in the Netherlands were cancelled until September 2020 due to the ongoing COVID-19 pandemic. Defqon.1 was held virtually in 2021, with sets from participating performers streamed from the Defqon.1 website.

The festival was held in person again in 2022, with over 100.000 unique visitors.

Festival history

See also 
List of electronic music festivals

References

External links 

Defqon.1 Weekend Festival
Q-Dance
Q-Dance Global
Defqon.1 Festival Australia
Q-Dance Australia
Q-Dance Chile
Defqon.1 Chile

Music festivals established in 2003
2003 establishments in the Netherlands
2009 establishments in Australia
2018 disestablishments in Australia
Electronic music festivals in the Netherlands
Trance festivals
Electronic music festivals in Australia
Festivals in Sydney
Music in Sydney
Music in Flevoland
Music in Dronten
Events in Almere